Meline may refer to:

Places
 Meline, a parish in north Pembrokeshire in the Diocese of St David's

People 

 Jules Méline, French statesman and prime minister
Jaime Meline or El-Producto, an American rapper, producer and entrepreneur
 Meline Daluzyan, an Armenian weightlifter

Mythology 

 Meline (mythology), a Thespian princess who bore Heracles a son

See also 
Melinești
Melinex

Greek mythology